Harvey Jerome Pulliam (born October 20, 1967) is an American former outfielder in Major League Baseball for the Kansas City Royals (1991-1993) and Colorado Rockies (1995-1997). He also played two seasons in Japan for the Orix BlueWave (1998-1999)

In 1989, Pulliam, was the Southern League's all-star game MVP.

In 2008, Harvey coached a little league team in Contra Costa County, California.

In six seasons covering 123 games, Pulliam batted .262 (49-for-187) with 8 home runs and 22 RBI.

External links

Career statistics and player information from Korea Baseball Organization

Kansas City Royals players
Colorado Rockies players
Baseball players from California
Major League Baseball outfielders
American expatriate baseball players in Japan
Orix BlueWave players
KBO League outfielders
American expatriate baseball players in South Korea
SSG Landers players
Appleton Foxes players
Memphis Chicks players
Omaha Royals players
Las Vegas Stars (baseball) players
Colorado Springs Sky Sox players
Richmond Braves players
1967 births
Living people
African-American baseball players
Gulf Coast Royals players
Baseball City Royals players
Olmecas de Tabasco players
American expatriate baseball players in Mexico